Zsolt Kovács (born 11 November 1962) is a Hungarian biathlete. He competed at the 1984 Winter Olympics and the 1988 Winter Olympics.

Biathlon results
All results are sourced from the International Biathlon Union.

Olympic Games

World Championships

*During Olympic seasons competitions are only held for those events not included in the Olympic program.

References

1962 births
Living people
Hungarian male biathletes
Olympic biathletes of Hungary
Biathletes at the 1984 Winter Olympics
Biathletes at the 1988 Winter Olympics
Skiers from Budapest